CWI may refer to:

In organizations and institutions:

Care for the Wild International
Centrum Wiskunde & Informatica, Amsterdam, The Netherlands
Certified Welding Inspector, American Welding Society
Children's Welfare Institute, Shanghai, China
Christian Witness to Israel
Civil War Institute at Gettysburg College
College of Western Idaho, a new Community College in Nampa, Idaho
Committee for a Workers' International, an international socialist organisation which split in 2019 into the Committee for a Workers' International (2019) and International Socialist Alternative
Communist Workers' International
Cricket West Indies, the governing body for cricket in the Caribbean

In other uses:

Chicago and Western Indiana Railroad
Civil War: The Initiative, a comic book crossover storyline.
Cloverway Inc., a Japanese Animation dubbing company in the United States
CWI (encoding), a Hungarian character set in the 1980s
The Cold War, on the grounds of a second